The canyon towhee (Melozone fusca) is a bird of the family Passerellidae.

Taxonomy
The taxonomy of the group of towhees to which this species belongs is debated. At the higher level, some authors place the towhees in the family Fringillidae. Within the genus, there has been dispute about whether the canyon towhee is a distinct species from the California towhee (Melozone crissalis) found in coastal regions from Oregon and California in the United States through Baja California in Mexico.  At present, molecular genetics seems to have settled this issue in favour of separation of the species.

Description
It is earthy brown in color, with somewhat lighter underparts and a somewhat darker head with a rufous cap (except that birds in central Mexico have the cap the same color as the back); there is also a slightly reddish area beneath the tail. There is little sexual dimorphism.

Distribution and habitat

The towhee is native to lower-lying areas from Arizona, southern Colorado, New Mexico and western Texas south to northwestern Oaxaca, Mexico, mostly avoiding the coasts.  Its natural habitat is brush or chaparral.

Behavior
The towhee feeds on the ground or in low scrub rather than in the tree canopy.  Near human habitation, it is often seen in parking lots, where it feeds on insects on the cars' grilles and takes cover under the cars when disturbed.

References

 Database entry includes justification for why this species is of least concern.

Johnson, R. R., and L. T. Haight. 1996. Canyon Towhee (Pipilo fuscus). In The Birds of North America, No. 264 (A. Poole and F. Gill, eds.). The Academy of Natural Sciences, Philadelphia, PA, and The American Ornithologists' Union, Washington, D.C.

External links
Page with photographs and recording from birdfotos.com
North American Bird Sounds—Parulidae through Icteridae with recordings and a link to a photograph.

canyon towhee
Birds of Mexico
Fauna of the Chihuahuan Desert
Native birds of the Southwestern United States
canyon towhee